The following are the football (soccer) events of the year 1949 throughout the world.

Events
March 31 - The 1948/49 Albanian First Division championship is annulled by the Albanian Sports Federation.

Winners club national championship

Argentina
Racing Club

Austria
Austria Vienna

Chile
Universidad Católica

Colombia
Millonarios

Costa Rica
Alajuelense

Egypt
Al Ahly

England
for fuller coverage see 1948-49 in English football
First Division: Portsmouth
Second Division: Fulham
Third Division North: Hull City
Third Division South: Swansea City
FA Cup: Wolves

France
Stade de Reims

Hong Kong
South China AA

Iceland
KR

Italy
Torino F.C.

Mexico
León

Paraguay
Club Guaraní

Romania
Divizia A: ICO Oradea
Divizia B: CFR Sibiu, Dinamo B București
Cupa României: CSCA București

Scotland
for fuller coverage see 1948-49 in Scottish football
League Division A: Rangers
League Division B: Raith Rovers
League Division C: Stirling Albion
Scottish Cup: Rangers
Scottish League Cup: Rangers

Spain
U.D. Las Palmas

Switzerland
FC Lugano

Turkey
Ankaragücü

Uruguay
Peñarol

USSR
Dynamo Moscow

West-Germany
VfR Mannheim

International tournaments
1949 British Home Championship (October 9, 1948 – April 9, 1949)

1949 South American Championship (April 3 – May 11, 1949)

Births
 January 4 – Mick Mills, English footballer and manager
 January 27 – Per Røntved, Danish international footballer
 April 16 – Claude Papi, French international footballer (died 1983)
 June 7 – Lou Macari, Scottish international footballer
 August 26 – Alberto Cardaccio, Uruguayan international footballer (died 2015)
 September 18 – Peter Shilton, English international footballer
 September 25 – Jean Petit, French international footballer
 November 11 – Safet Berisha, Albanian international footballer (died 2016)
 November 22 – Reiner Geye, German international footballer (died 2002)
 December 19 – Christian Dalger, French international footballer

Deaths

References

 
Association football by year